Local elections were held in Belgium on 9 October 1994. The ten provincial councils as well as all municipal councils were elected.

The election was, apart from the European election in June that year, the first one since the fourth state reform, which made provincial elections concurrent with municipal elections rather than with parliamentary elections. Legislative terms for provincial councils were thus increased from four years or less to six years. Additionally, the reform split the province of Brabant into Flemish Brabant and Walloon Brabant, thus increasing the number of provinces from nine to ten.

Provincial councils

References
 Election database

1994
1994 elections in Belgium
October 1994 events in Europe